HM Prison Oakwood is a Category C prison in Featherstone, Staffordshire, England. First opened in April 2012, the prison is operated by G4S and was primed to be in full operation by autumn 2012. Originally called Featherstone 2 and designed to be a titan prison, it was downsized to hold up to 1,605 prisoners with construction starting in August 2009. It was built in a modular fashion, the first time this had been done in the UK.

Following the announcement that it would be contracted out to a private company along with HMP Birmingham, the Prison Officers Association threatened industrial action. The prison also received heavy criticism following a surprise inspection by HM Inspector of Prisons; a report published by the inspectorate in October 2013 identified several issues of concern, including a high level of violence.

History
Projected initially as being a titan prison, and holding up to 2,500 offenders, it was downsized following the cancellation of the titan scheme. It was estimated at costing around £180million and was described in the press as a "superprison". The prison is located next to existing prisons HMP Featherstone and HMYOI Brinsford and was constructed by Kier Build. Building the prison at that location required additional road remodelling to cope with an anticipated additional 1,400 rush-hour journeys down local roads. The A460 Cannock Road was remodelled at the junction with New Road in Featherstone, but the local council was criticised in the local press for not going far enough with the changes.

Pre-construction on the prison site began in August 2009. The prison is the first to be built in a modular fashion in the UK, with pre-construction sections put in place that contain plumbing, electricity and fire alarm systems. The modules first arrived in February 2010, which formed the energy centre for the project. Once completed, the prison will comprise three house blocks and 13 other buildings.

Although reported by some media outlets as being sold, it was contracted out to private service provider G4S in March 2011, for a period of fifteen years, along with HMP Birmingham, to become G4S’ fifth and sixth prisons in England and Wales. Secretary of State for Justice Kenneth Clarke announced the outcome of the bidding process in the House of Commons, stating that Featherstone 2 would come in at £31 million less than announced by the previous government.

Following the announcement, the Prison Officers Association announced that its members were "angry" at the privatisation of public prisons. The association balloted its members to find out if they wanted to take industrial action over the issue, stating, "It is important to gauge the view of our members through the ballot box, and if it is their will the POA will take clear and decisive action against the privatisation of Birmingham and Featherstone 2." Steve Gillian, the general secretary of the POA, said that "This is a disgraceful decision which is politically driven and morally repulsive." The military were placed on standby should the POA take the threatened strike action.

Clarke was questioned in the Commons at the time of the announcement by constituency MP Gavin Williamson regarding the levels of staff training provided to the new prison compared to the two other publicly run prisons also located nearby. He said in response to the query, "That is provided for in the contract and I very much hope it will be the case. Like my hon. Friend, I have great optimism about the future of Featherstone 2. It is very good that we have that kind of investment coming on stream so that we can help to modernise the service in all possible ways. The proper training and support of staff is a key part of delivering the contract properly."

The prison was officially named HMP Oakwood in December 2011, named after the oak tree in which Charles II was reputed to have hidden from Oliver Cromwell’s troops during the English Civil War, nearby in Boscobel Wood.

HMP Oakwood took its first prisoners on 24 April 2012 with the goal of being fully operational by August or September the same year.

Criticism
In October 2013, the prison was criticised by HM Inspector of Prisons following a surprise inspection. Of particular concern to them was a high level of violence within the jail, concerns that staff were not properly experienced to deal with inmates, and fears that sex offenders were not having their offences addressed. Frances Crook of the Howard League for Penal Reform expressed concerns over the revelations, stating, "It is well-known in prison circles that this institution is referred to as 'Jokewood' by prisoners and staff across the system, but this isn't a joke – it is deeply serious." In response to the report, G4S said that steps were already being taken to improve the situation at Oakwood. It was subsequently reported that Prisons Ombudsman Nigel Newcomen had identified "serious failings" in a report into the death of an inmate at the jail. Newcomen reported that prison staff found the inmate collapsed and not breathing in his cell, but were unable to access a defibrillator because it was locked away.

In January 2014, the prison again garnered controversy as it emerged that ambulances had been called there 358 times in 2013, which was over twice the amount of any other UK prison.

References

External links
 G4S pages on Oakwood

G4S
Oakwood
Prisons in Staffordshire
2012 establishments in England
Private prisons in the United Kingdom